Civico zero is a 2007 Italian drama film written and directed by Francesco Maselli. It is inspired by the book Il nome del barbon of Federico Bonadonna.

Plot 
The film consists of three episodes, each one starring a professional actor. They are, respectively, Letizia Sedrick (episode I), Ornella Muti (episode II) and Massimo Ranieri (episode III).

Episode I: Stella (Letizia Sedrick) is a young Ethiopian who arrived in Rome. She lives in a container, finds a job at via Marsala and marries with Joseph, an old African friend. The life of the couple is hard, being constrained to move from town to town to find jobs.

Episode II: Nina (Ornella Muti) is Romanian and lives in Rome without a residence permit. She fights against social loneliness and seeks a job, though the main obstacle is the lack of knowledge of the Italian language. thanks to the help of another Romanian lady she finds a job as domestic worker for two ladies aged 92 and 62, and living completely alone in Rome.

Episode III: Giuliano (Massimo Ranieri) is a fruit seller at Campo de' Fiori in Rome. After his mother's death he became mad, and is walking through the city without any aim.

Cast  
 Ornella Muti as Nina, Romanian migrant
 Massimo Ranieri as Giuliano
 Letizia Sedrick as Stella, Ethiopian migrant

References

External links

2000s political drama films
Italian political drama films
Films directed by Francesco Maselli
2007 drama films
2007 films
2000s Italian films
2000s Italian-language films